The East Siberian Laika (Vostotchno-Sibirskaia Laika) is a Russian breed of dog of spitz type, a hunting dog originating in parts of Siberia east of the Yenisei River.

Description

Appearance 

Black and tan, with light patches (called karamis), grizzle, patched, ticked, white, grey, black, red and brown of all shades. There are two major types, the Evenki and the Irkutsk; other less important types are the Yakutia, Amur and Tofolar. These types vary in color and physique, as the ESL is still more of a diverse conglomerate breed than the other three Russian Laika breeds. Physically the ESL is somewhat rangy, nearly square in proportion, slightly higher at the withers than at the croup, robust in bone; head shape varies with the regional varieties. Ears are erect and triangular, the tail carried in a curve over the back. The coat is a medium long double coat with straight coarse guard hair and a soft thick undercoat.

Purpose 

The ESL is a natural hunting dog used for a wide variety of small and large game, ranging from squirrels, marten, sable, and grouse to moose, bear, wild boar and mountain lions. They can also be used as sled dogs.

Temperament 
East Siberian Laika are friendly to humans, have a pronounced hunting passion, as well as a strong, balanced character. For the breed, malevolence towards humans is not typical, nevertheless, in places of primordial breeding they were often used as a guard. Very well adapted for hard work in the harsh conditions of the mountainous Siberian taiga.

Origin and History
The breed designation was established at the All-Union Cynological Congress in 1947, along with that of the other three Laika breeds. The breed originated with dogs from the Lake Baikal region, Irkutsk Province, Evenki National Territory, the Amur River basin and Maritime Territory. The first breed standard was set by wildlife biologist K. G. Abramov. Systematic breeding began in the 1970s in government kennels at Irkutsk and in Leningrad.
According to a 2011 geneticist study, East Siberian laika and non-barking Basenji dogs from Congo and Sudan belong to the Y-chromosome haplogroup HG9.

See also
 Dogs portal
 List of dog breeds

References
Voilotchnikov, A.T. and Voilotchnikova, S.D. Hunting Laikas, . Moscow: Forest Industry Publishing House 1982. 
Voilotchnikov, A. T. and Voilotchnikova, S.D.Laikas and Hunting With Them . Moscow: Forest Industry Publishing House, 1972. 
Beregovoy, Vladimir Hunting Laika Breeds of Russia. Crystal Dream Publishing, 2001. 
Maria Georgievna Dmitrieva-Sulima The Laika, and Hunting with Laika (Лайка и охота с ней). (2003, original edition 1911). Aquarium Book, .                          

Dog breeds originating in Russia
FCI breeds
Hunting dogs
Spitz breeds
Dog breeds originating in the Soviet Union